The 1976 Hamilton mayoral by-election was held to fill the vacant position of Mayor of Hamilton in New Zealand. The polling was conducted using the standard first-past-the-post electoral method.

Background
Seven candidates came forward to succeed him. A by-election for a seat on the Hamilton City Council occurred concurrently after the resignation of Ian James Drabble, who had moved outside of Hamilton.

Candidates
Seven candidates were nominated, the largest field of candidates for a mayoral election since 1950. The candidates were:

Bruce Beetham, A lecturer at Hamilton Teachers' College and leader of the Social Credit Party since 1972.
Nicholas Gerardus Buysman, A committee member of the Hamilton Businessmen's Club and past president of the Waikato Restaurant Association. He stood unsuccessfully for the Hamilton City Council in 1971 and 1974. He stood for the mayoralty and council vacancies.
Ross Jansen, A lawyer who was a Hamilton City Councillor from 1965 to 1974 and deputy mayor from 1971 to 1974.
Douglas Bruce Mills, A building company director and a Hamilton City Councillor, first elected in 1959. Former mayor Denis Rogers endorsed Mills.
Archibald Henry Otton, A Welsh-born sheepskin store proprietor and ex-serviceman in the Royal New Zealand Air Force.
Robert Ivan Peace, A manager of a wine company and president of the New Zealand Wine Resellers' Association. He was a member of the Waikato Electric Power Board and had been a Hamilton City Councillor since 1968.
Matthew Cowley Te Hira, A motor mechanic and insurance salesman.

Polling
Three telephone polls were conducted.

Results
The race quickly became a two-horse race between Beetham and Jansen. Both were attacked by other candidates for being allegedly partisan given Beetham's status as leader of Social Credit and Jansen's affiliation to the National Party. Both countered by saying they would not politicise the office of mayor. The election resulted in Beetham ultimately winning. May Woodcock, a local schoolteacher, won the vacant council seat. Both Beetham and Woodcock were sworn in officially on 12 May.

Mayoral by-election

Council by-election

References

Mayoral elections in New Zealand
1976 elections in New Zealand
Politics of Hamilton, New Zealand